William Claude McKinney (born July 14, 1945) is a former American football linebacker in the National Football League for the Chicago Bears. He played college football at the West Texas A&M University and was drafted in the 16th round of the 1972 NFL Draft.

References

External links
Pro Football Archives page

1945 births
Living people
Players of American football from Texas
American football linebackers
West Texas A&M Buffaloes football players
Chicago Bears players
People from Borger, Texas